The Bull Run Mountains is a mountain range in Elko County, Nevada, United States. Much of the range is contained within the Mountain City Ranger District of the Humboldt-Toiyabe National Forest.

The range was named in commemoration of the Battle of Bull Run, in the American Civil War.

References 

Mountain ranges of Nevada
Mountain ranges of Elko County, Nevada
Humboldt–Toiyabe National Forest